Alex Hijmans (born 1975) is a Dutch multingual journalist and author. He has published several works in the Irish language.

Biography
Hijmans was born in 1975 in Heemskerk, Netherlands. He spent twelve years in Ireland, where he acquired fluency in the Irish language and engaged in media studies at the National University of Ireland, Galway. He then worked as a reporter for RTÉ and TG4 and for the defunct Irish language newspaper Foinse, and contributed to other publications, including The Irish Times. He moved to Brazil in 2008.

He has published a selection of books in Irish, including Favela, a non-fiction work about life in a Brazilian slum; novels Aiséirí and An Tearmann; and Gonta, a short story collection. His second collection of short stories in Irish, Idir Dhá Thír, was released in 2017.

Hijmans contributes to media outlets in Ireland and Britain and is the Brazil correspondent for DNP, a Dutch digital newspaper. He is a regular contributor to online Irish-language news website Tuairisc.ie.

Published works
 Favela (Cois Life, 2009)
 Aiséirí (Cois Life, 2011)
 Gonta (Cois Life, 2012)
 Splancanna ó Shaol Eile (Cois Life, 2013)
 An Tearmann (Cois Life, 2016)
 Idir Dhá Thír (Cois Life, 2017)

See also
 Panu Petteri Höglund

References

External links
 Alex Hijmans’ website

1975 births
Living people
Dutch male writers
Dutch male novelists
21st-century Dutch male writers
Dutch journalists
People from Heemskerk
Irish-language writers
Alumni of the University of Galway